Saint-Eustache is an off-island suburb of Montreal, in western Quebec, Canada, west of Montreal on the north shore of the Rivière des Mille Îles.

History
The city was founded in 1770 and was incorporated in 1835. It has a famous church, Saint-Eustache church, which was built between 1780 and 1783.

A significant battle of the Lower Canada Rebellion was fought here on December 14, 1837. In the Battle of Saint-Eustache, the rebels were defeated, and the town was burnt. The church was fully rebuilt after the burning except for the front facade, where canon bullet holes can still be found.

In 1979, General Motors opened a transit bus manufacturing facility in Saint-Eustache. The factory has produced vehicles under the brands of GM, MCI and, since 1993, has been owned by Nova Bus.

Saint-Eustache was also home to the Autodrome Saint-Eustache from 1965 to 2019, which hosted various stock-car racing, local drag racing, and other race competitions.

Demographics 

Population trend:
 Population in 2021: 45,467 (2011 to 2021 population change: 2.9%)
 Population in 2011: 44,154 (2006 to 2011 population change: 4.9%)
 Population in 2006: 42,062 (2001 to 2006 population change: 4.2%)
 Population in 2001: 40,378
 Population in 1996: 39,848
 Population in 1991: 37,278

Mother tongue (as of 2016) :
 French as first language: 88.56%
 Other as first language: 5.96%
 English as first language: 3.7%
 English and French as first language: 0.96%

Attractions

Major parks in the area:

 Parc Mont Saint-Eustache
 Parc Chenier
 Parc Clair Matin
 Parc Boisé des Moissons
 Parc Nature Saint-Eustache

Attractions include:

 Ciné-Parc Saint-Eustache - drive in theatre
 Place St-Eustache - mall
 Carrefour Grande Cote - mall
 Marché aux puces St-Eustache - flea market
 Maison de la culture et du patrimoine
 Moulin Légaré
 Complexe Aquatique Saint-Eustache
 Guy-Bélisle Library

Transportation

Quebec Autoroute 640, Quebec Route 344 and Quebec Route 148 are the major highways servicing Saint-Eustache.

Exo operates several bus routes, which connect at Terminus Saint-Eustache:

 8 Saint-Eustache - Laval
 80 Saint-Eustache - Pointe-Calumet
 88 Saint-Eustache - Sainte-Thérèse
 89 Saint-Eustache - Secteur Dubois 
 90 Saint-Eustache - Arthur-Sauvé and Industrial 
 91 Saint-Eustache East (Saint-Laurent) 
 92 Saint-Eustache Central 
 93 Sainte-Marthe-sur-le-Lac - Saint-Eustache

There are no train stations near Saint-Eustache, the closest being Deux-Montagnes station, a commuter rail station along the Deux-Montagnes line
in neighbouring Deux-Montagnes, Quebec.

The closest airports are Montréal–Pierre Elliott Trudeau International Airport to the south and Montréal–Mirabel International Airport to the north.

Education
The Commission scolaire de la Seigneurie-des-Mille-Îles (CSSMI) operates French-language public schools:

 École secondaire des Patriotes
 École Arc-en-ciel
 École Clair Matin
 École au Coeur-du-Boisé
 École Curé-Paquin
 École Horizon-Soleil
 École Notre-Dame
 École Village-des-Jeunes
 École des Jardins-des-Patriotes
Some residents are zoned to École primaire Girouard in Mirabel and École secondaire d'Oka in Oka

The Sir Wilfrid Laurier School Board operates English-language schools. Lake of Two Mountains High School in Deux-Montagnes serves the community. Mountainview Elementary School and Saint Jude Elementary School, both in Deux-Montagnes, also serve the community.

References

External links

 Ville de Saint-Eustache Website (French Only)
  

 
Cities and towns in Quebec
Chade est leur plus grande fierté aussi